Sullivan County is a county located in the northern portion of the U.S. state of Missouri. As of the 2020 census, the population was 5,999. Its county seat is Milan. The county was organized February 14, 1845 and named for Major General John Sullivan of the American Revolutionary War.

History
In 1682, René-Robert Cavelier, Sieur de la Salle claimed the territory west of the Mississippi River for France, which included present-day Sullivan County. The United States acquired this region under terms of the Louisiana Purchase on July 4, 1803. Twenty-one years later, the Sac (Sauk), Meskwaki (Fox), and Iowa Native American nations ceded their tribal land to the U.S. government under two treaties in August 1824.

Dr. Jacob Holland and his son, Robert W. Holland, arrived in 1836, becoming the county's first permanent White settlers. Dr. Holland, a veteran of the Black Hawk War and practitioner of herbal medicine, and son staked their home sites at the Main Locust Creek Settlement near a place called Scottsville. American pioneers from Ohio, Illinois, Kentucky, Tennessee, and Virginia quickly followed them and established farms and small businesses at Pharsalia (Milan) Settlement, Yellow Creek Settlement, and Jackson's Corners (Jacksonville) by 1840.

The Missouri state legislature defined the boundaries of the county from Chariton County during the 1842–1843 legislative session, and first named it Highland County. However, the number of permanent settlers did not meet requirements for civil governance and military purposes, so legislators attached administration of Highland County to Linn County. A new survey of the county in 1844 determined that the population was sufficient to permit full organization. E.M.C. Morelock, a representative from Highland County, presented an act to the state legislature, which they approved on February 14, 1845, and the county became formally organized. By the same act, it was renamed Sullivan County in honor of John Sullivan, a major general in the Continental Army during the American Revolutionary War.

Settlers established the town of Milan (pronounced MY-lun) in 1845, located at the center of the county, where the first courts met. William Putnam built the first courthouse, which was occupied in October 1847. Ten years later, residents leveled an Indian mound in the middle of town to make the public square and Major John McCollough built the second courthouse, the first brick structure in Milan, on this site during 1857–1858.  (This courthouse was destroyed by fire in 1908 and it was not until 1938 that it was replaced by the three-story limestone building that stands today.) The last federal land office established in Missouri also operated from the square from 1849 to 1859. The state legislature officially incorporated the city of Milan on February 8, 1859. Other towns platted in the county's early years included Greencastle (1857), Newtown (1858), Pollock (1873), Boynton and Cora (1877), Green City and Winigan (1880), Humphreys and Reger (1881), Osgood (1886), and Harris (1887). Green City College opened in 1885, and a business institute opened in Humphreys in 1884.

During the U.S. Civil War (1861–1865), a Union Army post stood in Milan. The Union cause was supported by four Union volunteer infantry regiments, two Union cavalry volunteer regiments, two Missouri Militia units, one provisional militia unit, and a large unit of Sullivan County Home Guards. The Confederate side was supported by four units of Missouri State Guard infantrymen. Soldiers from Sullivan County fought at the Battle of Shiloh, Battle of Atlanta, Battle of Jonesborough, and other major engagements throughout the war. Military skirmishes within the county were mostly confined to bushwhackers.

Expansion of the railroads brought growth to Sullivan County beginning in the 1870s. The C., B. & K.C. (Chicago, Burlington and Kansas City Railway) built a line running north to south through the county in 1876, which was followed by construction of the Quincy, Missouri & Pacific Railway line east to west through the county from 1878 to 1881. The two lines crossed in Milan, which became a major shipping point. The Chicago, Milwaukee & St. Paul Railway soon built a north–south line along Medicine Creek the length of the western edge of the county that served the towns of Newtown and Harris, which continues to be active today. (All three railroads eventually merged into the Chicago, Burlington and Quincy Railroad.)

By 1900, following the railroad construction boom, the county's population exceeded 20,000. However, business activity and the number of residents declined steadily during the subsequent decades. The number of farms decreased from about 3,100 in 1900 to under 900 by 1982, but over the same time period, the size of farms increased from about 130 acres to 385 acres. The county primarily remains rural agricultural land today, planted in corn and grains with family operated poultry, livestock, and dairy farms. One medium size manufacturer in Milan employs about 750 people.

Geography

The main water courses in Sullivan County are Medicine, Locust, East Locust, Yellow, and Spring Creeks.

Adjacent counties
Putnam County (north)
Adair County (east)
Linn County (south)
Grundy County (southwest)
Mercer County (northwest)

Major highways
 Route 5
 Route 6
 Route 129
 Route 139

Demographics

As of the census of 2010, there were 6,714 people, 2,925 households, and 1,959 families residing in the county.  The population density was 11 people per square mile (4/km2).  There were 3,364 housing units at an average density of 5 per square mile (2/km2).  The racial makeup of the county was 88.73% White, 0.51% Black or African American, 0.66% Native American, 0.12% Asian, 0.13% Pacific Islander, 8.67% from other races, and 1.19% from two or more races. Approximately 18.59% of the population were Hispanic or Latino of any race, making Sullivan County the most heavily Hispanic/Latino county in Missouri.

There were 2,925 households, out of which 29.60% had children under the age of 18 living with them, 53.30% were married couples living together, 9.10% had a female householder with no husband present, and 33.00% were non-families. 29.10% of all households were made up of individuals, and 15.00% had someone living alone who was 65 years of age or older.  The average household size was 2.42 and the average family size was 2.95.

In the county, the population was spread out, with 25.00% under the age of 18, 7.50% from 18 to 24, 26.30% from 25 to 44, 22.70% from 45 to 64, and 18.50% who were 65 years of age or older.  The median age was 39 years. For every 100 females there were 100.10 males.  For every 100 females age 18 and over, there were 97.70 males.

The median income for a household in the county was $26,107, and the median income for a family was $33,590. Males had a median income of $23,245 versus $19,167 for females. The per capita income for the county was $13,392.  About 11.00% of families and 16.50% of the population were below the poverty line, including 19.60% of those under age 18 and 20.90% of those age 65 or over.

2020 Census

Education

Public schools
Green City R-I School District – Green City
Green City Elementary School (PK-06)
Green City High School (07-12)
Milan C-2 School District – Milan
Milan Elementary School (PK-04)
Milan Middle School (05-08)
Milan High School (09-12)
Newtown-Harris R-III School District – Newtown
Newtown-Harris Elementary School (PK-06)
Newtown-Harris High School (07-12)

Public libraries
Sullivan County Library

Politics

Local
The Republican and Democratic parties equally control politics at the local level in Sullivan County. Both parties hold about half of the elected positions in the county.

State

Sullivan County is part of Missouri's 3rd district in the Missouri House of Representatives, currently represented by Nate Walker (R-Kirksville).

  

Sullivan County is a part of Missouri's 12th District in the Missouri Senate and is currently represented by Dan Hegeman (R-Cosby).

Federal

Sullivan County is included in Missouri's 6th Congressional District and is currently represented by Sam Graves (R-Tarkio) in the U.S. House of Representatives.

Missouri presidential preference primary (2008)

Former U.S. Senator Hillary Clinton (D-New York) received more votes, a total of 506, than any candidate from either party in Sullivan County during the 2008 presidential primary.

Communities

Cities

Browning (partly in Linn County)
Green City
Greencastle
Harris
Milan (county seat)
Newtown

Villages
Humphreys
Osgood
Pollock

Census-designated place
Winigan

Unincorporated communities
Owasco
Reger

Former communities
Source

Bairdston
Boynton
Brown
Bute
Cookman
Cora
Jacksonville
Judson
Lindley
Mystic
Opel
Parsons
Paw Paw
Pennville
Sorrell
Sticklerville
Wintersville

Townships
Source

Bowman
Buchanan
Clay
Duncan
Jackson
Liberty
Morris
Penn
Pleasant Hill
Polk
Taylor
Union

Notable people
Gene Bartow - Hall of Fame college basketball coach and NBA executive.
Fred Burke - bank robber and gangster, lived under an alias for several months near Green City before being captured there in March 1931.
 Bud Houser - Winner of multiple Olympic medals in track and field events. Born in Winigan.

See also
National Register of Historic Places listings in Sullivan County, Missouri

References

External links
 Digitized 1930 Plat Book of Sullivan County  from University of Missouri Division of Special Collections, Archives, and Rare Books
 SullivanCountyMissouri.com, local history and information.
 TheLibrary.org, A Directory of Towns, Villages, and Hamlets Past and Present of Sullivan County, Missouri.

 
1845 establishments in Missouri
Populated places established in 1845